The Brochet MB.30 was a single-seat sports aircraft designed by Maurice Brochet in the mid-1930s.

The MB-30 surname was "little pike".

Design and development
The MB.30 was a parasol-wing monoplane of all-wooden construction.

It is derived from the MB-20, the noticeable change was the addition of a tractor engine.

Specifications

References

1930s French sport aircraft
Brochet aircraft
Homebuilt aircraft
Single-engined tractor aircraft
Parasol-wing aircraft
Aircraft first flown in 1934